Adelino Teixeira may refer to:
 Adelino Teixeira (footballer)
 Adelino Teixeira (cyclist)